This is a list of municipalities in Serbia which have standing links to local communities in other countries known as "town twinning" (usually in Europe) or "sister cities" (usually in the rest of the world).

A
Ada

 Bogyiszló, Hungary
 Budakalász, Hungary
 Inárcs, Hungary
 Joseni, Romania
 Makó, Hungary
 Nemesnádudvar, Hungary

 Újbuda (Budapest), Hungary

Aleksinac

 Aiani, Greece
 Hisarya, Bulgaria
 Laurium, Greece
 Probištip, North Macedonia
 Zagorje ob Savi, Slovenia

Aranđelovac

 Han Pijesak, Bosnia and Herzegovina
 Kavala, Greece
 Ptuj, Slovenia
 Turčianske Teplice, Slovakia

B
Bačka Topola

 Belváros-Lipótváros (Budapest), Hungary
 Gheorgheni, Romania
 Herceg Novi, Montenegro

 Kiskunmajsa, Hungary
 Orahovica, Croatia
 Rožňava, Slovakia
 Szentes, Hungary

Bački Petrovac

 Babušnica, Serbia
 Kirchheim unter Teck, Germany
 Martin, Slovakia
 Nitra, Slovakia
 Ružomberok, Slovakia
 Stará Ľubovňa, Slovakia
 Vukovar, Croatia

Bečej

 Banovići, Bosnia and Herzegovina
 Csongrád, Hungary
 Galanta, Slovakia
 Istra, Russia
 Miercurea Ciuc, Romania
 Szekszárd, Hungary

Belgrade

 Banja Luka, Bosnia and Herzegovina
 Chicago, United States
 Corfu, Greece
 Coventry, England, United Kingdom
 Ljubljana, Slovenia
 Shanghai, China

Belgrade – Čukarica

 Bač, Serbia
 Berane, Montenegro
 Budva, Montenegro
 Ervenik, Croatia
 Heraklion, Greece
 Istočno Novo Sarajevo (Istočno Sarajevo), Bosnia and Herzegovina
 Kumanovo, North Macedonia
 Sykies, Greece
 Thasos, Greece

Belgrade – Mladenovac

 Gornja Radgona, Slovenia
 Ivanovo, Russia

Belgrade – New Belgrade

 Banja Luka, Bosnia and Herzegovina

 Karpoš (Skopje), North Macedonia
 Xanthi, Greece

Belgrade – Palilula
 Gradiška, Bosnia and Herzegovina

Belgrade – Rakovica

 Kamena Vourla, Greece
 Podsused – Vrapče (Zagreb), Croatia

Belgrade – Stari Grad

 Bitola, North Macedonia
 Centar (Skopje), North Macedonia
 Erzsébetváros (Budapest), Hungary
 Germasogeia, Cyprus
 Kotor, Montenegro
 Rigas Feraios, Greece
 Stari Grad (Sarajevo), Bosnia and Herzegovina

Belgrade – Zemun

 Banja Luka, Bosnia and Herzegovina
 Esch-sur-Alzette, Luxembourg
 Herceg Novi, Montenegro
 Keqiao (Shaoxing), China
 Kranj, Slovenia
 Mödling, Austria
 Nyasvizh, Belarus
 Offenbach am Main, Germany
 Puteaux, France
 Tilburg, Netherlands
 Velletri, Italy
 Veria, Greece

Beočin

 Battonya, Hungary
 Herceg Novi, Montenegro
 Ugljevik, Bosnia and Herzegovina

Bor

 Bar, Montenegro
 Le Creusot, France
 Khmelnytskyi, Ukraine

 Shanghang County, China
 Vulcan, Romania
 Vratsa, Bulgaria

C
Čačak

 Bratunac, Bosnia and Herzegovina
 Brezno, Slovakia
 Katerini, Greece
 Valašské Meziříčí, Czech Republic

Čoka

 Arilje, Serbia
 Bordány, Hungary
 Decs, Hungary
 Deta, Romania
 Sokobanja, Serbia
 Wisła, Poland

Ćuprija

 Celje, Slovenia
 Doboj, Bosnia and Herzegovina
 Gradiška, Bosnia and Herzegovina

G
Gornji Milanovac

 Blagoevgrad, Bulgaria
 Edessa, Greece
 Kavadarci, North Macedonia
 Kumanovo, North Macedonia
 Nowogard, Poland
 Pleven, Bulgaria
 Slavonska Požega, Croatia
 Slovenj Gradec, Slovenia
 Staro Nagoričane, North Macedonia
 Starodub, Russia
 Starše, Slovenia
 Trebinje, Bosnia and Herzegovina
 Vefsn, Norway
 Vlasenica, Bosnia and Herzegovina

I
Inđija

 Gevgelija, North Macedonia
 Jablanica, Bosnia and Herzegovina
 Ohrid, North Macedonia
 Paderno Dugnano, Italy
 Al-Salt, Jordan

J
Jagodina

 Chrysoupoli, Greece
 Corinth, Greece
 Delčevo, North Macedonia
 Dubica, Bosnia and Herzegovina
 Kassandreia, Greece
 Marsa Alam, Egypt
 Novi Pazar, Serbia
 Perdika, Greece

K
Kanjiža

 Budaörs, Hungary
 Felsőzsolca, Hungary
 Ferencváros (Budapest), Hungary
 Kiskunhalas, Hungary
 Kráľovský Chlmec, Slovakia
 Nagykanizsa, Hungary
 Röszke, Hungary
 Sfântu Gheorghe, Romania
 Svilajnac, Serbia
 Tata, Hungary
 Vodice, Slovenia

Kikinda

 Bihać, Bosnia and Herzegovina
 Jimbolia, Romania
 Kiskunfélegyháza, Hungary
 Kondoros, Hungary
 Medgidia, Romania
 Nagydobos, Hungary
 Narvik, Norway
 Nof HaGalil, Israel
 Prijedor, Bosnia and Herzegovina
 Reşiţa, Romania
 Silistra, Bulgaria
 Szolnok, Hungary
 Žilina, Slovakia

Kladovo
 Hillerød, Denmark

Kragujevac

 Bar, Montenegro
 Bat Yam, Israel
 Bielsko-Biała, Poland
 Bydgoszcz, Poland
 Carrara, Italy
 Ingolstadt, Germany
 Jericho, Palestine
 Karlovac, Croatia
 Mogilev, Belarus
 Ohrid, North Macedonia
 Piteşti, Romania
 Reggio Emilia, Italy
 Smolensk, Russia
 Springfield, United States
 Stari Grad (Sarajevo), Bosnia and Herzegovina
 Suncheon, South Korea
 Suresnes, France
 Trenčín, Slovakia
 Xi'an, China

Kraljevo

 Gjorče Petrov (Skopje), North Macedonia
 Grodno, Belarus
 Ivanovo, Russia
 Lod, Israel
 Maribor, Slovenia
 Niagara Falls, Canada
 North Mitrovica, Kosovo
 Plužine, Montenegro
 South Euclid, United States
 Uvarovo, Russia
 Zielona Góra, Poland

Kruševac

 Bijeljina, Bosnia and Herzegovina
 Corfu, Greece
 Kiryat Gat, Israel
 Novopolotsk, Belarus
 Odintsovo, Russia
 Pistoia, Italy
 Râmnicu Vâlcea, Romania
 Szentendre, Hungary
 Volgograd, Russia

Kula

 Bar, Montenegro
 Kalocsa, Hungary

L
Leskovac

 Bijeljina, Bosnia and Herzegovina
 Elin Pelin, Bulgaria
 Kumanovo, North Macedonia
 Kyustendil, Bulgaria
 Lanzhou, China
 Plovdiv, Bulgaria
 Silistra, Bulgaria

Loznica
 Płock, Poland

M
Mali Iđoš

 Bar, Montenegro
 Cetinje, Montenegro
 Gádoros, Hungary
 Sokobanja, Serbia
 Solnechnogorsk, Russia

N
Niš

 Beersheba, Israel
 Belgorod, Russia
 Glyfada, Greece
 Kaluga, Russia
 Košice, Slovakia
 Kursk, Russia
 Saltdal, Norway
 Veliko Tarnovo, Bulgaria
 Vitebsk, Belarus

Novi Pazar

 Bayrampaşa, Turkey
 Jagodina, Serbia
 Karatay, Turkey
 Kocaeli, Turkey
 Novi Pazar, Bulgaria
 Pendik, Turkey
 Vranje, Serbia
 Yalova, Turkey

Novi Sad

 Budva, Montenegro
 Changchun, China
 Dortmund, Germany
 Gomel, Belarus
 Ilioupoli, Greece
 Kumanovo, North Macedonia
 Modena, Italy
 Nizhny Novgorod, Russia
 Norwich, England, United Kingdom
 Pécs, Hungary
 Timișoara, Romania
 Toluca, Mexico

P
Pančevo

 Bonyhád, Hungary
 Boulogne-Billancourt, France
 Byala Slatina, Bulgaria
 Kumanovo, North Macedonia
 Michalovce, Slovakia
 Mrkonjić Grad, Bosnia and Herzegovina
 Neapoli, Greece
 Prijedor, Bosnia and Herzegovina
 Ravenna Province, Italy
 Reşiţa, Romania
 Stavroupoli, Greece
 Stupino, Russia
 Voskresensk, Russia

Paraćin

 Jablanica, Bosnia and Herzegovina
 Kotor Varoš, Bosnia and Herzegovina
 Krapina, Croatia
 Murska Sobota, Slovenia
 Pazin, Croatia
 Perdika, Greece
 Pljevlja, Montenegro

Požarevac

 Bar, Montenegro
 Bitola, North Macedonia
 Reșița, Romania
 Volokolamsk, Russia

S
Šabac

 Argostoli, Greece
 Celje, Slovenia
 Fujimi, Japan
 Kiryat Ata, Israel
 Kralupy nad Vltavou, Czech Republic

Senta

 Budavár (Budapest), Hungary
 Cristuru Secuiesc, Romania
 Csorvás, Hungary
 Dabas, Hungary
 Dunajská Streda, Slovakia
 Dunaszentgyörgy, Hungary
 Gödöllő, Hungary
 Hódmezővásárhely, Hungary
 Kaszaper, Hungary
 Kranj, Slovenia
 Medijana (Niš), Serbia
 Mukachevo, Ukraine
 Tiszafüred, Hungary
 Törökszentmiklós, Hungary

Smederevo

 Tangshan, China
 Volos, Greece
 Zhlobin, Belarus

Sombor

 Baja, Hungary
 Celje, Slovenia
 Kispest (Budapest), Hungary
 Veles, North Macedonia

Sremska Mitrovica

 Banja Luka, Bosnia and Herzegovina
 Dunaújváros, Hungary

Sremski Karlovci

 Bardejov, Slovakia
 Karpoš (Skopje), North Macedonia
 Tivat, Montenegro

Subotica

 Brest, Belarus
 Dunajská Streda, Slovakia
 Kiskunhalas, Hungary
 Łomża, Poland
 Odorheiu Secuiesc, Romania
 Olomouc, Czech Republic
 Osijek, Croatia
 Szeged, Hungary

T
Tutin

 Gaziosmanpaşa, Turkey
 Iznik, Turkey
 Mostar, Bosnia and Herzegovina

U
Užice

 Cassino, Italy
 Harbin, China
 Kursk, Russia
 Ljutomer, Slovenia
 Veles, North Macedonia

V
Valjevo

 Pfaffenhofen an der Ilm, Germany
 Prievidza, Slovakia
 Rehovot, Israel

 Świdnik, Poland
 Velenje, Slovenia

Velika Plana

 Budva, Montenegro
 Radoviš, North Macedonia

Vranje

 Brod, Bosnia and Herzegovina
 Bryukhovetsky District, Russia
 Cetinje, Montenegro
 Kumanovo, North Macedonia
 Leposavić, Kosovo
 Novi Pazar, Serbia
 Trikala, Greece

Z
Žagubica
 Piotrków Trybunalski, Poland

Zrenjanin

 Arad, Romania
 Békéscsaba, Hungary
 Bijeljina, Bosnia and Herzegovina
 Laktaši, Bosnia and Herzegovina
 Noginsk, Russia
 Trebinje, Bosnia and Herzegovina

Notes

References

Serbia
Serbia geography-related lists
Foreign relations of Serbia
Towns in Serbia